Aboubacar Doumbia (born 12 November 1999) is an Ivorian professional footballer who plays in Cyprus for Karmiotissa, on loan from Maccabi Netanya.

References

1999 births
Living people
Ivorian footballers
Association football forwards
Footballers at the 2020 Summer Olympics
Olympic footballers of Ivory Coast
Ykkönen players
Israeli Premier League players
SOA (football club) players
CSO Amnéville players
Kokkolan Palloveikot players
Maccabi Netanya F.C. players
Karmiotissa FC players
Maccabi Petah Tikva F.C. players
Expatriate footballers in France
Expatriate footballers in Finland
Expatriate footballers in Israel
Expatriate footballers in Cyprus
Ivorian expatriate sportspeople in France
Ivorian expatriate sportspeople in Finland
Ivorian expatriate sportspeople in Israel
Ivorian expatriate sportspeople in Cyprus